Kaḻayapiṯi (also written Kaḻaya Piṯi and Kaḻaiapiṯi) is a rock hole in the Birksgate Range in northwestern South Australia. It is an important location in the early history of the Pitjantjatjara people.

Kaḻayapiṯi forms the southern heartland of the traditional Pitjantjatjara territory. According to the anthropologist Norman Tindale, the Pitjantjatjara people originally migrated from the southern coast. Kaḻayapiṯi served as their main home as they moved further north and northeast into the Tomkinson, Mann and Petermann Ranges. The rock hole here was very important during droughts, as there were few sources of water so reliable and permanent in the Great Victoria Desert to the south. However, during a long and severe drought between 1914 and 1916, the Pitjantjatjara were forced to move further east into the Musgrave Ranges, traditionally Yankunytjatjara territory.

References

More reading

Waterholes of South Australia
Anangu Pitjantjatjara Yankunytjatjara